Cabaguil is one of the thirteen Maya gods who created the world. Also called "Heart of the Sky," Cabaguil is a sky god.

Maya gods
Sky and weather gods